Bill Blackshaw (6 September 1920 – 1994) was an English professional footballer who played as a winger, in the Football League for Manchester City, Oldham Athletic, Crystal Palace and Rochdale. His first professional club was Manchester City but after only three appearances his career was interrupted by the Second World War. When football resumed thereafter, he moved on to play for Oldham Athletic and subsequently Crystal Palace and Rochdale. He later moved into non-league football with Stalybridge Celtic.

Blackshaw died in 1994 aged 73 or 74.

References

External links

Bill Blackshaw at holmesdale.net
Bill Blackshaw Man City Player by Player at Google books

1920 births
1994 deaths
Footballers from Ashton-under-Lyne
English footballers
Association football midfielders
English Football League players
Manchester City F.C. players
Oldham Athletic A.F.C. players
Crystal Palace F.C. players
Rochdale A.F.C. players
Stalybridge Celtic F.C. players